Caumasee-Lift is a funicular at Flims, Canton of Graubünden, Switzerland. It provides access to Caumasee at 1003 m - with its bath and restaurant - from an upper station at 1075 m, on Via Dil Lag in Flims Waldhaus. Since 1990, the installation consists of a pair of fully automated inclined elevators. The track has a length of 125 m at an incline of 35%. The upper station can be reached by foot in 10 minutes from the bus stop "Flims-Waldhaus, Caumasee“.

Hotel Waldhaus operated an extensive bath at the lake. The elevator was built in 1937, on the initiative of the owner of the hotel, by Wagons- und Aufzügefabrik Schlieren for Genossenschaft Caumaseelift. The cooperative sold it to the municipality of Flims in 1974.

References 

Flims
Funicular railways in Switzerland
Inclined elevators
Railway lines opened in 1937
Transport in Graubünden

de:Caumasee-Lift